Crofton Ritchie McKenzie (17 February 1894 – 11 November 1927) was an Australian rules footballer who played with Carlton in the Victorian Football League (VFL).

He died at the young age of 33 on 11 November 1927 in Numurkah, some months after suffering a ruptured spleen in a football match.

Notes

External links 

Croft McKenzie's profile at Blueseum

1894 births
1927 deaths
Australian rules footballers from Victoria (Australia)
Carlton Football Club players